Musumba is a city in Lualaba Province in the Democratic Republic of Congo. It is the former capital of the Kingdom of Lunda. The practices of the Lunda kingdom still persist in Musumba.

Musumba was the birthplace of Moïse Tshombe, a Congolese businessman and politician.

References 

Populated places in Lualaba Province